Ro Hindson (born 23 May 1951) is a Canadian rugby union player. He played in 31 matches for the Canada national rugby union team from 1973 to 1990, including two matches at the 1987 Rugby World Cup.

References

1951 births
Living people
Canadian rugby union players
Canada international rugby union players
Place of birth missing (living people)